Karian Rural District is a rural district (dehestan) in the Central District of Minab County, Hormozgan Province, Iran. At the 2006 census, its population was 14,537, in 2,863 families. The rural district has 33 villages.

References 

Rural Districts of Hormozgan Province
Minab County